The Church of Jesus Christ of Latter-day Saints in North Carolina refers to the Church of Jesus Christ of Latter-day Saints (LDS Church) and its members in North Carolina. In 1894, there were 128 members of the LDS Church. It has since grown to more than 91,000 members in 179 congregations.

Official church membership as a percentage of general population was 0.82% in 2014. According to the 2014 Pew Forum on Religion & Public Life survey, roughly 1% of North Carolinans self-identify themselves most closely with The Church of Jesus Christ of Latter-day Saints. The LDS Church is the 8th largest denomination in North Carolina.

History

North Carolina was originally part of the Southern States Mission when it was created on December 15, 1896. It then became part of the East Central States Mission on December 9, 1928. On October 26, 1947, it became part of the Central Atlantic States Mission. The mission was then renamed the North Carolina-Virginia Mission on June 10, 1970.

The North Carolina Mission was organized on July 18, 1973. It was renamed the North Carolina Greensboro Mission on June 20, 1974. On July 1, 1980, the mission split moving the mission office to Charlotte. The North Carolina Charlotte and the North Carolina Raleigh Missions were the result of the split.

Stakes
The following stakes are a list of stakes with stake centers in North Carolina as of February 2023:

 The Charlotte Stake was organized on November 19, 1972, then renamed the Charlotte North Carolina Stake on September 21, 1986, then renamed Charlotte North Carolina South Stake on September 21, 1986.
 The Greensboro Stake was organized on September 13, 1961, then renamed the Greensboro North Carolina on Stake September 21, 1986.
 The North Carolina Stake was organized on August 27, 1961, then later renamed the Kinston North Carolina Stake, and then the Greenville stake when it was divided in 2021.
 The Raleigh Stake was organized on December 9, 1962, then later renamed the Raleigh North Carolina Stake.
 The Wilmington Stake was organized on May 21, 1972, then later renamed the Wilmington North Carolina Stake.
 The Statesville North Carolina Stake was organized on November 20, 1977, then renamed the Winston-Salem North Carolina Stake on November 25, 1979.

Temples
On December 18, 1999 the Raleigh North Carolina Temple was dedicated by President Gordon B. Hinckley.

See also

The Church of Jesus Christ of Latter-day Saints membership statistics (United States)
North Carolina: Religion

References

External links
 ComeUntoChrist.org Latter-day Saints Visitor site
 The Church of Jesus Christ of Latter-day Saints Official site